Stargate Atlantis is an American-Canadian military science fiction television series and part of MGM's Stargate franchise. The series was created by Robert C. Cooper and Brad Wright as a spin-off series to Stargate SG-1. The series aired for five seasons and 100 episodes on the US Sci Fi Channel. Stargate Atlantis premiered on SCI FI on July 16, 2004; its final episode aired on January 9, 2009.

Since 2005, Stargate Atlantis was nominated for various awards during its five-year run. Among them, the series has been nominated for four Emmy Awards, eleven Gemini Awards (two were won), 27 Leo Awards (ten were won), one Nebula Award, one People's Choice Award which was won, and two Visual Effects Society Awards. Out of the total 62 nominations, Stargate Atlantis won 19 awards.

Canadian Screenwriting Awards
Stargate Atlantis was nominated for two Canadian Screenwriting Awards.

Chicago International Film Festival
Stargate Atlantis was nominated for one Silver Plaque in the Chicago International Film Festival, 2005.

Constellation Awards
The series was nominated for two Constellation Awards.

DGC Craft Awards
Stargate Atlantis was nominated for one DGC Craft Award by the Directors Guild of Canada.

Emmy Awards
Stargate Atlantis was nominated for four Emmy Awards. From those, they were nominations for "Outstanding Special Visual Effects for a Series" twice, and one each for "Outsdanding Main Title Theme Music" and "Outstanding Music Composition for a Series (Dramatical Underscore)".

Gemini Awards
Stargate Atlantis was nominated for sixteen Gemini Awards. They were nominated for four awards in 2005, one in 2006, two in 2007, four in 2008, and five in 2009. In total, they won four awards.

Leo Awards
Stargate Atlantis was nominated for a total of 27 Leo Awards, ten of which were for 2005, while the other 17 were for 2009.

Nebula Awards
The series was nominated for a Nebula Award in 2009.

New York Film Festival
Stargate Atlantis won a Bronze Worldmedal in the New York Film Festival in 2005.

People's Choice Awards
In 2008, Stargate Atlantis was nominated for "Best Sci-Fi Show" for the 34th People's Choice Awards, where it was up against Battlestar Galactica and Doctor Who.

Saturn Awards
The series was nominated for two Saturn Awards in 2005, and for one in 2006.

Visual Effects Society Awards
Two episodes were nominated for Visual Effects Society Awards. One was nominated in 2005, while the other was nominated in 2008. Both were nominated for "Outstanding Visual Effects in a Broadcast Series".

WorldFest-Houston International Film Festival
Stargate Atlantis was nominated for a First Place Platinum in the 2005 WorldFest-Houston International Film Festival.

See also
List of Stargate SG-1 awards and nominations
List of Stargate Universe awards and nominations

References

External links
 Awards for Stargate Atlantis at IMDB

Stargate
Stargate